The  is a folk museum in Kiyose, Tokyo. It was established in November 1985 and — unlike other municipal museums at the time —  the aim was to go beyond the mere display of items and to provide an interactive personal experience.

See also
List of Important Tangible Folk Cultural Properties

References 

Museums in Tokyo
City museums in Japan
Folk museums in Japan
Kiyose, Tokyo
Museums established in 1985
1985 establishments in Japan